John Livermore (born 29 October 1940) was an English cricketer who played for Wiltshire. He was born in Greenford, Ealing, Middlesex.

Livermore, who made a single appearance for Leicestershire Second XI in 1963, represented Oxfordshire and later Wiltshire in the Minor Counties Championship. Livermore made a single List A appearance for Wiltshire, during the 1969 season, against Essex. From the tailend, he scored 2 runs, and took bowling figures of 0-56 from 11 overs.

External links
John Livermore at Cricket Archive

1940 births
Living people
English cricketers
Wiltshire cricketers
People from Ealing
Oxfordshire cricketers